Good As Gold is an album by the progressive bluegrass band Country Gentlemen, released in 1983.

Track listing

 Good as Gold 		 
 I Just Got Tired of Being Poor 		 
 Guysboro Train 		 
 Hard Times 		 
 When They Ring Those Golden Bells
 Someone Is Looking for Someone Like You 		 
 I've Gone Back to Being Me 		 
 Have I Told You Lately That I Love You 		 
 Four Walls 		 
 Lord, I Hope This Day Is Good 		 
 Night Ridin' 		 
 Detour

Personnel
 Charlie Waller - guitar, vocals
 Jimmy Gaudreau - mandolin, baritone/tenor vocals, guitar, bass
 Dick Smith - banjo, vocals
 Bill Yates - bass, tenor vocals
 Robbie Magruder - Drums

References

1983 albums
Sugar Hill Records albums
The Country Gentlemen albums